Lakshyam may refer to:

Lakshyam (1972 film), a 1972 Indian Malayalam film
Lakshyam (2007 film), a 2007 Telugu action film
Lakshyam (2017 film), a 2017 Indian Malayalam film

See also
Lakshya (disambiguation)